Claudio Antonioli (born 4 December 1962) is an Italian fashion entrepreneur.

He opened his first shop in Milan on Piazza Lima in 1987 under the eponymous name Antonioli, selling emerging fashion brands from all over the world at the time little known in Italy. Today its retail chain has 8 stores in Milan, Turin, Lugano and Ibiza.

In 2015, with Marcelo Burlon and Davide de Giglio, Antonioli founded the New Guards Group (NGG) and held the role of president. Under the guidance of Antonioli, NGG took majority shares in the new fashion brands as Marcelo Burlon County of Milan, Off-White c/o Virgil Abloh, Palm Angels, Unravel Project, Heron Preston, A Plan Application, Alanui, and Kirin by Peggy Gou. In August 2019, Farfetch acquired 100% of New Guards Group for $675 million.

In September 2016, he opened the nightclub VOLT in Milan.

In 2020, he bought the Antwerp-based fashion brand Ann Demeulemeester. In June 2021, he backed the launch of 44 Label Group, the fashion brand of the German DJ Max Kobosil.

References

1962 births
Living people

Company founders
Fashion designers from Milan